Hwang Ji-Woong (born 30 April 1989) is a South Korean footballer who plays as a forward for Daejeon Citizen in the K League Challenge.

External links 

1989 births
Living people
Association football forwards
South Korean footballers
Daejeon Hana Citizen FC players
Ansan Mugunghwa FC players
K League 1 players
K League 2 players
Dongguk University alumni